Harlan J. Swift (2 October 1843 - 6 October 1910) was a captain in the United States Army who was awarded the Medal of Honor for gallantry during the American Civil War. He was awarded the medal on 20 July 1897 for actions performed during the Siege of Petersburg in Virginia in 1864.

Personal life 
Swift was born on 2 October 1843 in Allegany County, New York to parents Calvin Swift and Sevilla R. Ault. He was one of four children in the family. He married Martha A. Higgins and fathered three children. Swift died in Lakeview, New York on 6 October 1910 and was buried in Cuba Cemetery in Cuba, New York.

Military service 
Swift enlisted in the Army as a private on 5 January 1864 in Buffalo, New York. He was assigned to Company H of the 2nd New York Mounted Rifles. He was commissioned as a sergeant on 6 January 1864. He was quickly promoted to second lieutenant on 4 February 1864. On 30 July 1864, during a Union charge at the Siege of Petersburg, he singlehandedly captured four retreating Confederate infantrymen, an action which earned him the Medal of Honor.

Swift's account of the action states:

He was promoted to first lieutenant on 20 October 1864 and to captain on 5 January 1865.

Swift's Medal of Honor citation reads:

He was mustered out of the Army on 10 August 1865. His medal is attributed to New York.

References 

1843 births
1910 deaths